Greg Donald Andres is an American attorney, who most notably served as an Assistant Special Counsel for Russian interference in 2016 United States elections under Robert Mueller. He rejoined the law firm of Davis Polk & Wardwell in June 2019.

Career
Andres previously served as a Deputy Assistant Attorney General for the Criminal Division of the Department of Justice from 2010 to 2012, an Assistant United States Attorney for the Eastern District of New York, where he rose to be Chief of the Criminal Division, and a partner at Davis Polk & Wardwell.

While at the Eastern District, Andres prosecuted numerous members of the Bonanno crime family, and was at least twice subject to assassination plots by family boss Vincent Basciano.  In early January 2005, federal witness Joseph Massino, while serving time at Brooklyn Metropolitan Detention Center, twice recorded Basciano on a wire conspiring to kill Andres.  In August 2006, after Basciano had been transferred to Metropolitan Correctional Center, New York in Manhattan, a fellow inmate passed on a hit-list of five individuals authored by Basciano to federal authorities, including Andres, Eastern District Judge Nicholas Garaufis, and three mafia informants.

While serving as Deputy Assistant Attorney General, Andres oversaw criminal fraud prosecutions and foreign bribery investigations under the Foreign Corrupt Practices Act.  Among the prosecutions brought by Andres from this office is that of then billionaire and Antiguan knight Sir Allen Stanford, who was sentenced to 110 years in prison and forced to forfeit billions of dollars in assets in relation to his $8 billion Ponzi scheme.

Andres was the 16th attorney hired by the Special Counsel's office when appointed by Mueller in August 2017.

Personal life
Andres is an alumnus of the University of Notre Dame, and the University of Chicago Law School. In 2001, Andres married Ronnie Abrams, now a Judge of the United States District Court for the Southern District of New York, while she was an Assistant United States Attorney specializing in violent gangs in the Southern District, and he specialized in organized crime and narcotics in the Eastern District.  Their wedding was performed by Judge Loretta Preska of the Southern District.

On July 11, 2017, just prior to the announcement of Andres's appointment in the Special Counsel's office, Abrams recused herself from the prior assigned cases CREW v. Trump and a companion Emoluments Clause lawsuit against Donald Trump; the cases were reassigned to George B. Daniels.

References

Year of birth missing (living people)
Place of birth missing (living people)
Living people
University of Chicago Law School alumni
University of Notre Dame alumni
Davis Polk & Wardwell lawyers
Members of the 2017 Special Counsel investigation team
Lawyers from New York City